Ghulam Haider (born 28 December 1997) is a Pakistani cricketer. He made his List A debut on 19 April 2016 for Baluchistan in the 2016 Pakistan Cup.

References

External links
 

1997 births
Living people
Pakistani cricketers
Baluchistan cricketers
Cricketers from Quetta